Clifford "Crooks" Allen was an American baseball pitcher in the Negro leagues. He played with the Homestead Grays in 1937 and the Memphis Red Sox in 1938.

References

External links
 and Baseball-Reference Black Baseball Stats and  Seamheads 

Homestead Grays players
Memphis Red Sox players
Year of birth missing
Year of death missing
Baseball pitchers